Emile De Beukelaer (27 May 1867–23 January 1922) was a Belgian road racing cyclist, and the founder and President of the Union Cycliste Internationale (UCI). He was the son of the founder of Elixir d'Anvers, a famous liquor from the Antwerp region.

Career

Cycling career
He was the most successful cyclist of the 1880s.

Foundation of UCI
On 14 April 1900, delegates from six associations and five countries assembled in Paris to form the "Union Cycliste Internationale". The delegates were:
Emile De Beukelaer for the "Ligue Velocipédique Belge"
Frenchman Victor Breyer for the "National Cycling Association" in the United States
Alfred Riguelle for the "Union velocipédique de France"
Count Villers for the "Union des Sociétés Françaises de Sports Athlétiques"
Mario Bruzzone representing the "Unione Velocipedistica Italiana"
Frenchman Paul Rousseau for the "Union Cycliste Suisse"
Paul Rousseau became the Secretary General, while Emile De Beukelaer became the President, and served as such until his death in 1922.

References

External links

1867 births
1922 deaths
Belgian male cyclists
Presidents of UCI
Cyclists from Antwerp